HRX may refer to:

 Zinc finger protein HRX, or simply HRX, an enzyme
 Hypo Real Estate (stock ticker symbol: HRX), a German company
 hrx, the ISO 639 language code of the Hunsrik language.